Danny Rahim (born 26 March 1986) is a British actor who is best known for his work in the series Primeval: New World, a spin-off of the British series Primeval.

Early years and career
Born in Hammersmith, London, trained and graduated at Manchester School of Theatre in Manchester. Rahim was guest star on the television series: Unforgiven, EastEnders, Young James Herriot and the movie Late Bloomers.

From 2012 to 2013, Rahim portrayed the lead character of Mac Rendell in the Space series Primeval: New World, a spin-off of the popular British series Primeval. On 21 February 2013, it was announced that the series had been cancelled after a single season.

Filmography

References

External links

1986 births
British male film actors
British male television actors
Living people
People from Hammersmith